Houjing is a station on the Red line of Kaohsiung MRT in Nanzih District, Kaohsiung, Taiwan.

The station is a three-level, elevated station with two Side platform and three exits. It is 153 meters long and is located near the intersection of Jiachang Rd. and Haijhuan Rd.

Around the station
 Houjin River
 National University of Kaohsiung
 National Kaohsiung University of Science and Technology
 Houjing Junior High School
 Houjing Elementary School

References

External links
KRTC Houjing Station

2008 establishments in Taiwan
Kaohsiung Metro Red line stations
Railway stations opened in 2008